Joe Churchman (18 September 1924 – 9 May 1993) was an  Australian rules footballer who played with Hawthorn in the Victorian Football League (VFL).
Winner of Hayward medal playing for South Bunbury football club 1952

Notes

External links 

1924 births
1993 deaths
Australian rules footballers from Victoria (Australia)
Hawthorn Football Club players